Shawn Andrews (born Shawn Andrew Milgroom) is an American actor. He is best known for his role as Kevin Pickford in the 1993 Richard Linklater film Dazed and Confused.

Career

Andrews first feature film was the cult film Dazed and Confused, where Andrews was cast as the character Kevin Pickford.   He went on to lead roles such as in The Small Hours and City of Ghosts. He played the lead protagonist in Fix, being awarded Best Actor at the Brooklyn Film Festival.  Andrews then appeared in  Big Heart City, which was nominated for an award at the Los Angeles Film Festival.

Personal life
In 1992 Andrews was briefly married to Milla Jovovich, who was 16 at the time. The marriage was annulled by Jovovich's mother two months later.

Filmography

References

External links

American male film actors
Living people
Male actors from Massachusetts
1971 births